Sonchiriya (ISO:  Sōnaciṛiyā ) is a 2019 Indian Hindi-language  action film co-written and directed by Abhishek Chaubey   and starring Sushant Singh Rajput, Bhumi Pednekar, Manoj Bajpayee, Ranvir Shorey and Ashutosh Rana. The film presents a rooted tale set in Chambal. Its dialogues are entirely in the Bundeli dialect.

The film was released on 1 March 2019 in 940 screens worldwide, with 720 screens in India and 220 in overseas regions. The film received positive reviews from critics, who praised the performances, direction, writing, cinematography and visual style.

Plot
Set in the ravines of the Chambal valley, the film tells the tale of dacoits in 1975, who termed themselves Baaghis, the rebels.

Lacchu gives information to the Baaghis that a dowry of tons of gold and cash will be given to the bride by her father so Dacoit Maan Singh a.k.a 'Dadda' should raid it. Special Task Force (STF) headed by Inspector Virendra Singh Gujjar attacks them during the loot in which Dadda gets killed. This leads to a split between the gang. Lakhna wants to surrender to the police, while Vakil Singh wants to follow Baaghi's dharm (way of life) of rebellion.

On the run, they meet Thakur's wife Indumati Tomar with a girl named Sonchiriya a.k.a 'Lalli' whom Indumati's family head had raped. Indumati had killed him to save Sonchiriya and ran away to rescue her and take her to hospital. Indumati's whole family wants to have her killed. She pleads with Baaghis to help her take Sonchiriya to the hospital. Baaghis agree.

Indumati's family arrives and tries to take away Khushi with them. At the same time, Vakil Singh agrees to let her go. Lakhna revolts and disagrees. In this melee, Indumati's own child accidentally kills Vakil's brother. Lakhna and the team, along with Indumati and Sonchiriya, escape and Vakil Singh vows to hunt them down and kill them all. It is revealed that Maan Singh looted the dowry house to save Lacchu's father from inspector Gujjar knowing very well that it was a trap to kill them. Gujjar had taken him hostage and promised to free him only if Lacchu brings Baaghis to that village for the police to kill all Baaghis at once and get the reward from the government.

Midway to the hospital, Lakhna tells Indumati a background story about a curse of killing innocent children inside a room by mistake which led to the Baaghis' whole group being killed one by one. They need to find Sonchiriya (a metaphor for a 'Saviour Girl') to get rid of the curse. Baaghis meet Dacoit Phuilya, and she joins Lakhna to save the girl and take them to Dholpur Hospital. They are joined again by Vakil Singh and the gang in the task. Vakil says, "to ward off the curse we need to save this girl from death. It is a chance to repent, this girl is "our Sonchiraiya, our saviour". Indumati's son wants to kill his mother, but Lakhna confronts and tells the truth that his grandfather was his biological father. Lakhna and Indumati make it to the hospital.

While the girl is being hospitalized, Lakhna, who, being chased by Gujjar, was hiding behind the tree, comes out to surrender as his task of saving Sonchiriya was finished. But by the curse, Lakhna is shot dead by Gujjar.

In the aftermath, it is revealed that Vakil Singh has actually been killed by the police at the railway station, as his corpse is loaded in a tractor. Later, while traveling towards the police station after killing Lakhna, Gujjar is shot and killed by one of his Thakur constable whose uncle (another constable with him in his gypsy) was earlier assaulted and insulted by him.

Cast 

 Sushant Singh Rajput as Lakhan "Lakhna" Singh
 Bhumi Pednekar as Indumati Tomar
 Manoj Bajpayee as Man Singh
 Ranvir Shorey as Vakil Singh
 Ashutosh Rana as Virendra Singh Gujjar
 Lankesh Bhardwaj as Inspector Fort
 Khushiya as Sonchiriya
 Wolf Rajput as Veer
 Jaspal Sharma as Lachchu
 Gagan Dev Riar as Khalifa
 Ram Naresh Diwakar as Natthi
 Mahesh Balraj as Bhoora
 Mukesh Gour as Sheetla
 Harish Khanna as Kok Singh
 Shridhar Dubey as Badlu Songh
 Abhimanyu Arun as Balak Ram
 Sampa Mandal as Phuliya
 Satya Ranjan as Veera
 V K Sharma as Pujari at temple.
.Vijay Kumar Dogra as Dr. Bhadauria

Production 
The principal photography for the film began on 19 January 2018 in Chambal. On 1 April 2018, the shoot was wrapped up.

Soundtrack 

The music of the film has been composed by Vishal Bhardwaj, while the lyrics have been written by Varun Grover except one song, "Naina Na Maar" (lyrics by Ashok Mizaj Badr).

Release 
The film was released on 1 March 2019. Unlike Udta Punjab, Abhishek Chaubey has a smooth ride with Sonchiriya as CBFC retains most of the abuses. British Board of Film Classification has certified the film with runtime of 143 minutes and the film is set for release. The film was released on 1 March 2019 to 720 screens in India and 220 screens in overseas circuit, making it 940 screens worldwide. The leading actor Sushant Singh Rajput was disappointed that many theaters used unofficial dubbed version of the movie.

Reception

Critical response
Raja Sen reviewing the film in Hindustan Times rated the film with three stars out of five. He liked the lead cast in role of bandits but feels that the slow pace kept the film from becoming a great film. Saibal Chatterjee of NDTV gave it three and half stars out of five and praising the acting of the whole cast he says "Cast Live And Breathe Their Roles". Renuka Vyavahare writing for The Times of India gave three and half stars out of five and writes "Gripping, tense and unpredictable, despite being a slow-burn western, Chaubey's period thriller makes for a riveting watch." Taran Adarsh giving three and half stars out of five feels that it is a very well-made film but caters to a niche audience. Anupama Chopra of Film Companion gives three stars out of five and summarize the review as "A Stunningly Shot, Masterfully Staged Fusion Of Caste, Violence And Jungle Law." Akash Deshpande of High on Films wrote "Sonchiriya is a mix of a thriller and black comedy with the aesthetics of spaghetti western."

Accolades

Notes

References

External links 
 
 
 
 

2010s Hindi-language films
2019 action films
Indian historical action films
Films set in 1975
Fictional portrayals of police departments in India